The 2000–01 Sunshine Tour, titled as the 2000–01 Vodacom Tour for sponsorship reasons, was the first season of professional golf tournaments since the southern Africa based Sunshine Tour was rebranded. Previously it had been known as the Southern Africa Tour. 

The Sunshine Tour represents the highest level of competition for male professional golfers in the region.  In its first year, the prize money was over 20% lower than the amount awarded the last year of the Africa Tour (R13.6 Million in 2000–01 vs. R17.5 Million in 1999–2000).

There were 22 official events on the schedule. This was an increase of five from the last year of the Southern Africa tour, with a significant change in the list of tournaments.

There were four tournaments from the previous season that were eliminated or not played:
Vodacom Series: Mpumalanga
Vodacom Series: Kwazulu-Natal
Vodacom Series: Free State
Royal Swazi Sun Classic (which resumed in 2001)

There were nine tournaments added/restarted for this season:
Riviera Resort Classic (played in 2000 only)
Emfuleni Classic (played in 2000 only)
Observatory Classic (played in 2000 only)
Cock of the North (first time played since 1985)
FNB Botswana Open (first time played since 1998)
Stanbic Zambia Open (first time played since 1998)
Nashua Nedtel Cellular Masters (first time played since 1999)
The Tour Championship (new tournament in 2001)
South African PGA Championship (first time played since 1999)

The tour was based predominantly in South Africa, with 17 of the 22 official tournaments being held in the country. One event each was held in Botswana, Swaziland, and Zimbabwe and two events were held in Zambia.  Two events, the Dunhill Championship and the Mercedes Benz SA Open Championship were co-sanctioned by the European Tour.

As usual, the tour consisted of two distinct parts, commonly referred to as the "Summer Swing" and "Winter Swing". Tournaments held during the Summer Swing generally had much higher prize funds, attracted stronger fields, and were the only tournaments on the tour to carry world ranking points.

The Order of Merit was won by Mark McNulty.

Schedule 
The following table lists official events during the 2000–01 season.

Order of Merit 
The Order of Merit was based on prize money won during the season, calculated in South African rand.

Notes

References

External links 

Sunshine Tour
Sunshine Tour
Sunshine Tour